Abdolreza (also transliterated as Abdulredha, Abdulreza, or Abd ol Reza) is a masculine Arabic given name composed of Abdol and Reza, meaning servant of the contented. It is especially popular in Iran. It is commonly associated with Twelver Shi'ites, who especially revere their 8th Imam, Ali al-Ridha. The name is forbidden for Sunnis, who may not use any names implying servitude to anything besides God. It may refer to:

People
Abdolreza Ansari (1925–2020), Iranian politician 
Abdolreza Barzegari (born 1958), Iranian footballer
Abdulredha Buhmaid (1982-2011), Bahraini victim of Death of Abdulredha Buhmaid
Abdolreza Ghanbari (born ca. 1968), imprisoned Iranian university lecturer
Abdolreza Jamilian (born 1965), Iranian orthodontist
Abdolreza Jokar, Iranian  Paralympic athlete
Abdolreza Kahani (born 1973), Iranian filmmaker
Abdolreza Mesri (born 1956), Iranian politician
Abdul Reza Pahlavi (1924–2004), Iranian prince, son of Rezā Shāh
Abdolreza Rahmani Fazli (born 1959), Iranian politician
Abdolreza Rajabi (1962–2008), Kurdish Iranian political activist who died in custody

See also
Abdul Hussein
Abdul Zahra

Arabic masculine given names
Iranian masculine given names